The National Basketball League Youth Player of the Year is an annual National Basketball League (NBL) award given in various iterations since the 1986 New Zealand NBL season to the best performing young New Zealander of the regular season. The award was originally known as Young Player of the Year from 1986 until 1991. Between 1992 and 2004, the award was called Rookie of the Year. A slight adjustment to the rules saw the Young Player of the Year return in 2005. The award changed back to Rookie of the Year in 2006 and remained every year until it was not awarded in 2017. Rookie of the Year returned in 2018 but was then replaced by Youth Player of the Year in 2019 and has remained since.

The 2011 Rookie of the Year, Steven Adams, went on to make the NBA. He is the half-brother of two-time Young Player of the Year, Warren Adams.

Winners

See also
 List of National Basketball League (New Zealand) awards

References

Awards established in 1986
Rookie
R